Cloud Peak  may refer to one of the following:

One of four mountain peaks in the United States:
Cloud Peak (Kodiak Island, Alaska)
Cloud Peak (North Slope, Alaska) - highest summit of the Philip Smith Mountains
Cloud Peak (Michigan)
Cloud Peak (Wyoming) - highest summit of the Big Horn Mountains and the 4th highest summit of the State of Wyoming
Cloud Peak (Taiwan), a mountain